Gramsh may refer to:
Gramsh District, former district in Elbasan County
Gramsh, Elbasan, a municipality in central Albania
Gramsh, Fier, a village in the municipality of Lushnjë, Fier County
Gramsh, Lezhë, a village in the municipality of Lezhë, Lezhë County

See also
KF Gramshi, football club of Gramsh, Elbasan
Grëmsh (dialectal rendering of Gramsh), village in Berat County
Gramshi, medieval tribe which may have originally founded the different Gramsh settlements.